KPS Chemik Police is the women's volleyball department of Polish sports club  based in Police and plays in the Orlen Liga.

Previous names
Due to sponsorship, the club have competed under the following names:
 KS Chemik Police (1989–1993)
 ARS Komfort Police (1993–1994)
 KS Chemik Police (1994–....)
 PSPS Chemik Police (....–2013)
 KPS Chemik Police (2013–2014)
 Chemik Police (2014–present)

History
Sports club  created its women's volleyball department in 1989. Two years later, in 1991, the club made its debut in the League 1, the highest division in Poland. In its second spell at League 1, the club had immediate success, winning the Polish Championships and the Polish Cup for two consecutive seasons (1993–94 and 1994–95). In that same period the club finished third at the 1993–94 CEV Cup Winners Cup. In October 1994, the club was renamed KS Chemik Police after losing its main sponsor and with financial issues in the following seasons, the club was relegated in 1998.

After years playing in the lower leagues under the name , a large industrial local chemical plant called Zakłady Chemiczne Police S.A. (a subsidiary of Grupa Azoty) which for long had a strategic partnership with the club, decided to invest in the club.

In 2013 the club was promoted to the Orlen Liga and was renamed . Since then the club won four Polish Championships (2013–14, 2014–15, 2015–16, 2016–17), three the Polish Cups (2013–14, 2015–16, 2016–17), two Polish Super Cups (2014, 2015) and finished fourth in the 2014–15 CEV Women's Champions League.

Honours

National competitions
  Polish Championship: 7
1993–94, 1994–95, 2013–14, 2014–15, 2015–16, 2016–17, 2017-18

  Polish Cup: 6
1992–93, 1993–94, 1994–95, 2013–14, 2015–16, 2016–17

  Polish Super Cup: 2
2014, 2015

Team
2017–2018 squad, as per March 2018.

References

External links

Official website 

Volleyball clubs established in 1989
1989 establishments in Poland
Women's volleyball teams in Poland
Police, West Pomeranian Voivodeship
Sport in West Pomeranian Voivodeship